Kärla is a small borough in Saaremaa Parish, Saare County in western Estonia.

Before 2015, Kärla was the administrative centre of Kärla Parish.

Rally driver Ott Tänak (born 1987), the 2019 World Champion, grew up in Kärla.

References

Populated places in Saare County
Boroughs and small boroughs in Estonia